The Big Float was an annual July celebration of the Willamette River in Portland, Oregon, United States. Established in 2011, as a benefit for the Human Access Project, attendees formed a giant people-powered flotilla and beach party to encourage Portlanders to reclaim the Willamette River for swimming and other aquatic recreation.

Description 
The float took about 45 minutes to one hour to complete.  The event kicked off with the River Hugger Swim Team swimming across the river, followed by an inner-tube parade from Tom McCall Bowl Beach in Waterfront Park along the esplanade to the put in at Poet’s Beach. Participants then floated back to Tom McCall Bowl Beach where they floated past two floating band stages to an after party.

History 
The Human Access Project, under the leadership of Willie Levenson, started the Big Float in 2011 to give Portland residents a positive interaction with the Willamette River.” The name for the event came from Portland's Big Pipe project — a 20-year undertaking that was completed in 2011. It entailed the overhaul of the city's wastewater system to divert sewage from flowing into the Willamette River and the Columbia Slough. After completion of the pipe project, the Willamette River became more swimmable. 

Since inception some 25,000 people have used tubes, kayaks, or flotation devices to drift half a mile downriver through the center of Portland in The Big Float.  Named the #16 top festival in Oregon out of 50 by The Oregonian. An estimated 6,000 people participated in 2018. Over 4,000 participated in 2019. There were no official Big Float events in 2020 or 2021 due to the COVID-19 pandemic. 

The tenth and final Big Float took place on July 10, 2022 and an estimated 5,000 people participated.  As in previous years, the Big Float was organized by the Human Access Project, a volunteer-driven advocacy group dedicated to transforming Portland's relationship with the Willamette River. Founder of the Human Access Project, Willie Levenson, maintains the Big Float achieved what it set out to do, and now the Human Access Project is in the process of coming up with other ways to connect Portlanders with the Willamette River.

References

External links

 

2011 establishments in Oregon
2022 disestablishments in Oregon
Annual events in Portland, Oregon
Recurring events disestablished in 2022
Recurring events established in 2011
Willamette River